Dronryp is a railway station located in Dronryp, Netherlands. The station was opened on 27 October 1863 and is located on the Harlingen–Nieuweschans railway between Harlingen and Leeuwarden. The train services are operated by Arriva.

The station was called Dronrijp (the Dutch name for the village) until 12 December 2015 when it was renamed Dronryp. This is to reflect the Frisian name of the town, which was changed in 2010.

Train services

Bus services

See also
 List of railway stations in Friesland

External links
NS website 
Dutch Public Transport journey planner 

Railway stations in Friesland
Railway stations opened in 1863
Railway stations on the Staatslijn B
Waadhoeke